The IMOCA 60 class yacht Fila was designed by Finot-Conq and launched in 1997 after being made by CNB in France.

Racing results

References 

1990s sailing yachts
Sailing yachts designed by Finot-Conq
Sailboat type designs by Groupe Finot
IMOCA 60
Sailboat types built in France